The Carolina RailHawks played the second season in team history in 2008.

2008 Competitions

2008 squad 

Transfers:
 OUT: Jamil Walker to Rochester Rhinos (7/9/2008); Connally Edozien to Miami FC (9/1/2008)
 IN: Hamed Diallo from Rochester Rhinos (7/9/2008); Ronald Cerritos from Real Maryland Monarchs (8/1/2008); Eddie Gutierrez from Miami FC (8/1/2008); Rey Ángel Martínez from Rochester Rhinos (8/21/2008)

2008 Staff 
Coach -  Scott Schweitzer
Assistant Coach -  Damon Nahas
Assistant Coach -  Mark Girard
Goalkeeping Coach -  David Noyes
Equipment Manager -  Jeff Morsch
Trainer -  Elise Caceres

2008 Schedule 

^ Televised nationally on Fox Soccer Channel

^^ Southern Derby fixtures

^^^ U.S. Open Cup fixtures

North Carolina FC seasons
Carolina Railhawks
Carolina RailHawks